Wilhelm Aleksander Thesleff  (27 July 1880, Viipurin maalaiskunta, Grand Duchy of Finland - 26 March 1941, Helsinki) was a Finnish general, first Minister of Defence of Finland and briefly the commander in chief of the Finnish army.

Thesleff began a military career in 1894 Hamina Cadet School from which he graduated in 1901. He continued his military studies in St Petersburg, Nicholas General Staff Academy in the years 1904–1907, and the Officers Cavalry School 1910–1911. He was promoted to the rank of lieutenant-colonel, 12 June 1912.

Thesleff attended the first world war the Russian army in 1914–1917, until he was taken prisoner by the Germans in Riga in September 1917. In October 1917 he was transferred by request of the military committee to serve as a liaison officer between the Finnish Jäger battalion fighting under the German command and the Germans. He deposed the unpopular Colonel Nikolai Mexmontan. He was commander of the 27th Jäger Battalion from 6 November 1917 until 25 February 1918. In March 1918 he was appointed as a liaison officer with the Baltic Sea Division during the Finnish Civil War.

After the Finnish Civil War Thesleff became the War Minister, 27 May 1918 – 27 November 1918 in the first cabinet of Juho Kusti Paasikivi. He was promoted to the rank of Major General, 14 June 1918. After the resignation of Major General Wilkman, as a war minister, Thesleff became commander in chief of the Finnish military forces on 13 August 1918.

Paasikivi cabinet had been leaning towards Imperial Germany. When Germany was defeated in the First World War the cabinet resigned. This also meant the end of Thesleff's political career.

1880 births
1941 deaths
People from Vyborg District
People from Viipuri Province (Grand Duchy of Finland)
Finnish major generals
Finnish senators
Military personnel of the Russian Empire
Russian military personnel of World War I
People of the Finnish Civil War (White side)
Ministers of Defence of Finland